Augustus Hutchison (born April 26, 1937 in Atlanta, Georgia) is a former racecar driver from the United States.

He was the winner of the 1967 SCCA Grand Prix Championship driving a Lotus 41.

In 1970, he purchased a Formula One Brabham BT26, entering it in the 1970 United States Grand Prix.  He retired after 21 laps with a loose fuel tank.

When Formula A became Formula 5000, Hutchison continued driving in the SCCA series, driving cars from Lola and March.

After retiring from racing, Hutchison focused on running his business, Solar Kinetics, based in Dallas.

Complete Formula One World Championship results 
(key)

Complete Formula One Non-Championship results 
(key)

References
Profile at grandprix.com

1937 births
Living people
American Formula One drivers
Racing drivers from Atlanta